Corvara in Badia (or Kurfar) is a comune (municipality) in South Tyrol in northern Italy, located about  east of Bolzano.

Geography

Corvara in Badia borders the following municipalities: Badia, Canazei, Livinallongo del Col di Lana, San Martin de Tor, and Sëlva.

Corvara in Badia is the main center of Alta Badia, a prestigious tourist area located at the top end of the Val Badia, surrounded by the peaks of the Dolomites mountains. Because of its geographic position in the heart of the Dolomites, Alta Badia gradually transformed itself into an avantgarde tourist area keeping intact its alpine character.

Frazioni
The municipality of Corvara in Badia contains the frazioni Calfosch (Italian: Colfosco, German: Kolfuschg) and Pescosta.

History

Coat-of-arms
The emblem represents three vert mountains, dominated by three gules peaks with the inclined top on an argent background. The three peaks represent the Sassongher mountain overlooking the village. The emblem was granted in 1969.

Society

Demographic evolution

Linguistic distribution
According to the 2011 census, 89.70% of the population speak Ladin, 6.84% Italian and 3.46% German as first language.

Sport

Maratona dles Dolomites

The finish of the annual single-day seven mountain passes crossing Maratona dles Dolomites bicycle race is in Corvara.

See also
 Alta Badia
 Dolomites

References

External links
Alta Badia Touristic Information

Municipalities of South Tyrol